Lads' Army (known in later series as Bad Lads' Army, Bad Lads' Army: Officer Class and Bad Lads' Army: Extreme) is a reality game show that constitutes a historically derived social experiment. Shown on ITV, the series is based on the premise of subjecting today's delinquent young men to the conditions of conscripts to British Army National Service of the 1950s to see if this could rehabilitate them.

The programme was derived from an earlier one called simply Lads' Army (a play on Dad's Army) in which a number of volunteers underwent four weeks of basic training for 1950s National Service. Unlike the three sequel series (the ones whose titles began with "Bad"), the original programme's experiment was merely to see if 18- to 24-year-old members of the modern British public could cope with the 1950s training, and how they compared to the public of that period. The success of the original series led to the experiment being repeated with the recruits having committed criminal offences, often given the option to undergo the training by courts as an alternative to serving pending sentences, to explore the proposition that it would be beneficial to reinstate National Service for petty criminals and delinquents as an alternative to more conventional sentences. Series 4 lowered the minimum age to 17 and raised the maximum age to 26.

The narrator for the first series was Kevin Whately, then Dennis Waterman took over until the show ended in 2006. Within each series a small number of the recruits have either walked out (after a 24-hour cooling off period), or been ejected. The majority of the remainder claim some benefit from the experience and some have chosen the British Army as a career at the end of it.

Format

The programme format is relatively simple. The recruits are issued period uniforms and equipment and fed, quartered and trained according to the standards of the era. Their free time is limited to visits to the NAAFI with period refreshments and facilities. The recruits form a single platoon made up of two sections, each under the care of a section commander, either Richard Nauyokas or Joe Murray (in series 3 Nauyokas was replaced by Glenn Thomas [who appeared as the Company Sergeant Major in series 2], although he still appeared as a relief corporal). During training the sections compete against each other, building a sense of competition but also of teamwork and loyalty. Success brings modest rewards. Praise is given for whole-hearted attempts at tasks. The NCOs and officers running the training are all, or have been, professional British soldiers.

Each series had a slightly different format to its predecessors, although the theme of 1950s military training is common to all series. The 3rd series (known as Bad Lads' Army: Officer Class) had the volunteers train to become officers while the 4th series (known as Bad Lads' Army Extreme) had the volunteers train to become paratroopers.

Series 1 to 3 had included interviews with celebrities who had completed National Service in the 1950s, including Joss Ackland, Michael Aspel, William Roache, Brian Blessed, Richard Briers, Paul Daniels, Frederick Forsyth, Bernard Manning, Nosher Powell, Andrew Sachs and Brian Sewell. During re-airings of the first series, the interviews were edited out.

Contestants

Series 1 (Lads Army, 2002)

Waterloo Platoon recruits 

Key
 PASSED OUT = Recruit was present at the final stages of training, at the Passing Out Parade.
 LEFT = Recruit quit or was discharged before making it to the final parade.

Series overview 
David Gardner received the "Best Recruit" award, James Willingham was awarded the platoons "Most Improved Recruit". 2 Section won "Best Section".

During the series, Tom Woolfe was dishonourably discharged/back squadded from the camp. Paul Clayden, Lee Wooten, and Chris Hampson chose the leave voluntarily. Nicholas Sandford deserted the base and never returned to camp. Jamie Dodd and Aaron Larson were medically discharged from the camp. William Wood's exit is unknown as his exit never aired.

After William Wood and Paul Clayden left, William Bate and Paul Eagle were drafted in as replacement recruits.

Captain Richard Owen, Waterloo Platoon's CO, died after the filming of the series in 2014, at age 48. He is said to have died from cancer.

The main filming location for series one was Browndown Training Camp at Lee-on-Solent.

Series 2 (Bad Lads Army, 2004)

Montgomery Platoon recruits 

Key
 PASSED OUT = Recruit was present at the final stages of training, at the Passing Out Parade.
 LEFT = Recruit quit or was discharged before making it to the final parade.

Series overview 
Tjobbe Andrews, Matthew Gilks and Robert Shutler were given Officer Recommendations. This would be the goal of the following series. John Kyprianou received the Platoon's Top Shot (the highest score in the shooting range). Marcus Birks received the Best Recruit award at the Pass Out Parade, with Robert Pembrook receiving the Most Improved award. 2 Section won Best Section. With 2 Section winning best section, CPL Murray was promoted to SGT at the Passing Out Parade.

Luke Brown and Ashley Morton were dishonourably discharged. Morton was the only recruit to be dishonourably discharged for committing a criminal offence, namely an unprovoked assault on John Kyprianou, who decided not to press charges. Scott Simpson, Daniel Kett and Chris Townsend chose to leave voluntarily. Ashley Cummings and Alan Brown's status' are unknown, as how they were discharged was never specified. Alan Brown also did not turn up on the first day due to a scheduled court appearance; he received a conditional discharge in connection with a fight that he had previously been involved in, with the requirement that he complete National Service.

After Scott Simpson quit before even being issued a single item of kit or his uniform, Alex Rennie was drafted in as a replacement recruit. At the time of the series release, there was speculation that Tom Woolfe from the first series who was back squadded was set to return but never did for unknown reasons. This is heavily suspected, as there was no replacement for 1 Section after Ashley Cummings left and Woolfe was in 1 Section during the first series, however, to this date, nothing has been confirmed.

After the filming of the series, Michael Lowes suffered from clinical depression after facing indecent exposure charges, and was found dead in his home from an apparent suicide in 2010, at age 28. SGT Alistair Rae, the platoon sergeant for Montgomery, Churchill and Pegasus Platoons, died in November 2020 due to complications from COVID-19, as did contestant Marcus Birks in 2021, at the age of 40.

The main filming location for series two was at New Zealand Farm Camp on Salisbury Plain.

Series 3 (Bad Lads Army: Officer Class, 2005)

Churchill Platoon recruits 

Key
 YES = Recruit was selected for officer training.
 NO = Recruit was not selected for officer training.
 LEFT = Recruit left the series, either voluntarily, due to being dishonourably discharged or a medical discharge.

Series overview 
The Passing Out Parade never stated who received "Best Recruit", or "Most Improved Recruit", as well as which Section were the winners overall. This is the only season that had no contestants born in the 1970s.

Wesley Worrall, Steven Bedford, and Matthew Tate were dishonourably discharged from the camp, Kirk Woodend chose to leave voluntarily and Adam Oakley was medically discharged, Dale Tate (Matthew Tate's brother) deserted the section and never returned to the Platoon; his brother deserted with him, but later returned. Simon Pinkney and Adrian Turton left the camp, however their exits were never aired.

After Wesley Worrall and Steven Bedford were discharged, Chris Danns and Matthew Rawlings were drafted in, as replacement recruits.

Robert Page initially was selected for officer training but quit before training began and was forced to return to unit.

At the end of the final episode, the narrator stated that 11 of 24 who passed out had subsequently applied to join the regular British Army.

Robert Page died after the filming of the series in 2020 at age 36. His cause is unknown.

The main filming location for series three was again at Browndown Training Camp at Lee-on-Solent.

Series 4 (Bad Lads Army: Extreme, 2006)

Pegasus Platoon recruits 

Key
 YES = Recruit was selected for the Final Parachute Jump
 NO = Recruit was not selected for Final Parachute Jump.
 LEFT = Recruit left the series, either voluntarily, due to being dishonourably discharged or a medical discharge.

Series overview 
The Passing Out Parade never stated who received "Best Recruit", or "Most Improved Recruit". Blue Section was the winning section.

Colin Elliot was Dishonourably Discharged from the camp. Keith Burke, Adam Mercer, Joel Whittaker, and Andrew Jimson were dismissed on Bin Day, just before the interrogation phase. Ron Spike, Leon White, Luke Howard, Matthew Reed, Raymond Impey, Darren McDonald, and Luke Moyes were all dismissed from the camp but their exits never aired. This series features a high amount of unusual dismissals, with 12 exits total.

After Colin Elliot and Ron Spike were discharged, Joe Peto and Steven Walker were drafted in, as replacement recruits. This was the first time that both replacement recruits went into the same section.

Aiden Chaffe died on 22 October 2018 at the age of 31 following a skydiving accident.

Series four was filmed at the Royal Navy Cordite Factory, Holton Heath, in Dorset. However, for the series, it was named 'Sandford Army Camp'.

Transmissions

Ratings
Official episode viewing figures are from BARB.

Series 1

Series 2

Series 3

Series 4

International versions
The TV format has been exported in Italy and aired in 2021.

References

External links

2002 British television series debuts
2006 British television series endings
2000s British reality television series
Historical reality television series
ITV reality television shows
Television series by Warner Bros. Television Studios
English-language television shows
Television shows set in Wiltshire